Oswaldo William España (born 1 February 1987) is an Ecuadorian footballer who plays for Deportivo Cuenca.

External links
EcuaFutbol profile

1985 births
Living people
Sportspeople from Guayaquil
Association football fullbacks
Ecuadorian footballers
C.S. Emelec footballers
C.D. Cuenca footballers